Crossovers are classic moves from Balboa (dance).

The pattern is back - together - forward with a quick - quick - slow rhythm,
or the down-hold rhythm.

Lead:
  - Step back left 45 degrees with left foot, leaving follow behind (allow arms to extend)
  - Step back with right foot, bringing feet together.
  - Step forward with left foot, crossing it over right foot, and bring follow back into original position.
  - Hold.
  - Step back right 45 degrees with right foot, leaving follow behind (allow arms to extend).
  - Step back with left foot, bringing feet together.
  - Step forward with right foot, crossing it over left foot, and bring follow back into original position.
  - Hold.position for 2seconds and repeat 

Crossovers can be done where both are going to the same side, or they are alternating.

Crossovers also include swivels and fall off the log.

See also Lollies (dance), Throwouts (dance).

Swing dance moves

Strength athletics